Erhard Turek (born November 6, 1942) was a Canadian football player for the Edmonton Eskimos and Hamilton Tiger-Cats. He won the Grey Cup with them in 1967. He previously played football at Waterloo Lutheran University in Waterloo, Ontario.

References

1942 births
Living people
Canadian football quarterbacks
Edmonton Elks players
Hamilton Tiger-Cats players
Wilfrid Laurier Golden Hawks football players